Jay Busbee (born Howard James Busbee Jr. on December 13, 1968, in Lynchburg, Virginia) is an American journalist, novelist, sportswriter and writer of comic books.

Early life and education
Busbee was raised in Atlanta, GA. He graduated from Riverwood High School in 1986, is a 1990 graduate of the College of William & Mary's English program and a 1996 graduate of the  University of Memphis’s Creative Writing MFA program. He lives in Atlanta with his family.

Career
Busbee's work has appeared in ESPN.com, Esquire Magazine, USA Today, The Washington Post, Atlanta Magazine, Slam Magazine, The Chicago Sports Review, Memphis Magazine, 64, Bluff Magazine, Mid-South Sports and Leisure, The Flat Hat, The Memphis Flyer and many other publications. Jay Busbee is the creator and head writer for Sports Gone South.

He is a contributing editor of Atlanta magazine, and also writes the monthly "Painting the Corners" column for ChopTalk, the official Atlanta Braves magazine. He has scripted comic books published by Arcana Studio and Digital Webbing. He has also written the books The Face of the River, Sundown and Bluff City. He has also co-written Jam! Amp Your Team, Rock Your Business and the comic books Velvet Rope and Kade: Rising Sun. He contributed the third story of the book Postcards: True Stories That Never Happened.

On February 16, 2016, Busbee published Earnhardt Nation: The Full-Throttle Saga of NASCAR's First Family.

He has appeared in The People Vs. Larry Flynt, and continues to teach English at Georgia Perimeter College.

Busbee currently edits From the Marbles, the official Yahoo! Sports NASCAR blog, and Devil Ball Golf, the official Yahoo! Sports golf blog. He also contributes to The Post Game.

He is currently writing another novel called Run & Shoot.

References

Living people
Yahoo! employees
University of Memphis alumni
College of William & Mary alumni
Writers from Lynchburg, Virginia
21st-century American novelists
American sportswriters
1968 births
Writers from Atlanta
American male novelists
Journalists from Virginia
Novelists from Virginia
Novelists from Georgia (U.S. state)
21st-century American non-fiction writers
American male non-fiction writers
21st-century American male writers